Cannondale Pro Cycling Team, previously known as Liquigas, was an Italian professional road bicycle racing team in the UCI ProTour.

History
The team was formed at the start of the UCI ProTour in 2005. the team was co-title sponsored by Italian companies Liquigas and Bianchi, therefore it was named Liquigas–Bianchi. It featured a number of big names including Italian riders Mario Cipollini, Danilo Di Luca and Stefano Garzelli, as well as Magnus Bäckstedt.

In 2007, Cannondale replaced Bianchi as the bicycle sponsor. This marked Cannondale's return to the ProTour after discontinuing sponsorship of the Lampre–Caffita team at the end of the 2005 season. Being an American company, their sponsorship led to a small American ridership on the team.

On 11 July 2008 the news broke from the French sports paper L'Équipe that Spanish rider Manuel Beltrán had tested positive for EPO after the first stage of the tour. It was blood abnormalities before the start of the tour that led France's Anti-Doping Agency to target the rider. According to AP a spokesperson for Liquigas confirmed the same day that Beltrán had been thrown off the tour. It was also reported that the police had picked Beltrán up from his hotel where he had been staying with the rest of the Liquigas team, as well as searching the rest of the hotel for more doping. It was later confirmed that his B-sample also tested positive.

From the 2009 Giro d'Italia until the 2012 Tour de France, the team finished every Grand Tour with all nine riders, a total of 11 such events in succession.

For the 2013 season Liquigas-Cannondale became Cannondale Pro Cycling as Cannondale Bicycle Corporation took over as the title sponsor in partnership with Brixia Sports.

Last team roster (in 2014)

Major wins

2005
Stage 4 Tour of Qatar, Mario Cipollini
Giro della Provincia di Lucca, Mario Cipollini
 Overall Settimana Internazionale di Coppi e Bartali, Franco Pellizotti
Stage 2, Franco Pellizotti
 Overall Tour of the Basque Country, Danilo di Luca
Stage 1, Danilo Di Luca
Amstel Gold Race, Danilo Di Luca
Flèche Wallonne, Danilo Di Luca
Stages 3 & 5 Giro d'Italia, Danilo Di Luca
Stage 2 Volta a Catalunya, Enrico Gasparotto
Stage 5 Tour de Suisse, Michael Albasini
 Road Race Championships, Enrico Gasparotto
Tre Valli Varesine, Stefano Garzelli
 Overall Circuit Franco-Belge, Marco Zanotti
Stage 4, Marco Zanotti
2006
Stage 2 Settimana Internazionale di Coppi e Bartali, Vincenzo Nibali
Rund um den Henninger Turm, Stefano Garzelli
Stage 10 Giro d'Italia, Franco Pellizotti
Stage 6 Volta a Catalunya, Matej Mugerli
Stage 4 Tour de Luxembourg, Stefano Garzelli
Gran Premio Città di Camaiore, Luca Paolini
Tre Valli Varesine, Stefano Garzelli
Stage 2 Eneco Tour, Manuel Quinziato
GP Ouest-France, Vincenzo Nibali
Stage 5 Vuelta a España, Danilo Di Luca
Stage 12 Vuelta a España, Luca Paolini
Trofeo Melinda, Stefano Garzelli
Memorial Cimurri, Enrico Gasparotto
2007
Tour du Haut Var, Filippo Pozzato
Omloop Het Volk, Filippo Pozzato
Milano–Torino, Danilo Di Luca
Stage 2 Paris–Nice, Franco Pellizotti
Stage 3 Settimana Internazionale di Coppi e Bartali, Danilo Di Luca
Stage 1 Driedaagse van De Panne, Luca Paolini
Stage 1 Settimana Lombarda, Team Time Trial
Stage 2 Settimana Lombarda, Roman Kreuziger
Stage 5 Settimana Lombarda, Alessandro Vanotti
Stage 2 Tour of the Basque Country, Manuel Beltrán
Stage 4 Circuit de la Sarthe, Michael Albasini
Liège–Bastogne–Liège, Danilo Di Luca
GP Industria & Artigianato di Larciano, Vincenzo Nibali
Giro di Toscana, Vincenzo Nibali
 Overall Giro d'Italia, Danilo Di Luca
Stage 1, Team Time Trial
Stages 4 & 12, Danilo Di Luca
Memorial Marco Pantani, Franco Pellizotti
Stages 3 & 4 Tour of Slovenia, Vincenzo Nibali
 Road Race Championships, Magnus Bäckstedt
Stage 5 Tour de France, Filippo Pozzato
Stage 4 Brixia Tour, Francesco Chicchi
Stages 1 & 4 Danmark Rundt, Francesco Chicchi
Clásica de San Sebastián, Leonardo Bertagnolli
Trofeo Matteotti, Filippo Pozzato
Stage 5 Tour de Pologne, Murilo Fischer
Stage 6 Tour de Pologne, Filippo Pozzato
Gran Premio Industria e Commercio di Prato, Filippo Pozzato
Memorial Cimurri, Leonardo Bertagnolli
2008
World's View Challenge 1 & 5, Manuel Quinziato
World's View Challenge 2, Leonardo Bertagnolli
Overall Giro della Provincia di Grosseto, Filippo Pozzato
Stage 1, Filippo Pozzato
Stage 3 Paris–Nice, Kjell Carlström
Stage 7 Tirreno–Adriatico, Francesco Chicchi
Stages 1a & 4 Settimana Internazionale di Coppi e Bartali – Francesco Chicchi
Stage 1b Settimana Internazionale di Coppi e Bartali, Team Time Trial
Overall Giro del Trentino, Vincenzo Nibali
Stage 3, Vincenzo Nibali
Stage 5 Tour de Romandie, Daniele Bennati
Stages 3, 9 & 12 Giro d'Italia, Daniele Bennati
Stage 16 Giro d'Italia, Franco Pellizotti
 Points classification in the Giro d'Italia, Daniele Bennati
Stage 6 Volta a Catalunya, Francesco Chicchi
Stage 3 Tour de Luxembourg, Michael Albasini
Stage 4 Tour of Slovenia, Francesco Chicchi
 Overall Tour de Suisse, Roman Kreuziger
Stage 8, Roman Kreuziger
Gran Premio Città di Camaiore, Leonardo Bertagnolli
Stage 3 Eneco Tour, Daniele Bennati
Trofeo Melinda, Leonardo Bertagnolli
Stage 1 Vuelta a España, Team Time Trial
Stage 4 Vuelta a España, Daniele Bennati
Stage 3 Deutschland Tour, Leonardo Bertagnolli
Stage 7 Tour of Missouri, Francesco Chicchi
Giro del Piemonte, Daniele Bennati
2009
Stage 6 2009 Tour Down Under, Francesco Chicchi
Trofeo Inca, Daniele Bennati
Stage 1 Giro della Provincia di Grosseto, Daniele Bennati
 Overall Giro di Sardegna, Daniele Bennati
Stage 4, Daniele Bennati
 Overall Driedaagse van De Panne, Frederik Willems
 Overall Giro del Trentino, Ivan Basso
 Overall Tour de Romandie, Roman Kreuziger
Stage 4, Roman Kreuziger
 Stages 10 & 17 Giro d'Italia, Franco Pellizotti
Stage 5 Critérium du Dauphiné Libéré, Sylwester Szmyd
Giro dell'Appennino, Vincenzo Nibali
 Time Trial Championships, Maciej Bodnar
 Road Race Championships, Kjell Carlström
 Mountains classification in the Tour de France, Franco Pellizotti
Stage 3 Tour de Pologne, Jacopo Guarnieri
Gran Premio Città di Camaiore, Vincenzo Nibali
Giro della Romagna, Murilo Fischer
Stage 6 Tour of Missouri, Francesco Chicchi
2010
 Overall Tour de San Luis, Vincenzo Nibali
Stage 1, Francesco Chicchi
Stage 4, Vincenzo Nibali
Stages 4 & 6 Tour of Qatar, Francesco Chicchi
Stage 2 Tour of Oman, Daniele Bennati
 Overall Giro di Sardegna, Roman Kreuziger
Stage 2, Roman Kreuziger
Stages 3 & 5 Paris–Nice, Peter Sagan
Stage 3 Tirreno–Adriatico, Daniele Bennati
 Overall Settimana Internazionale di Coppi e Bartali, Ivan Santaromita
Stage 1a, Francesco Chicchi
Stage 1b, Team Time Trial
Stage 7 Presidential Cycling Tour of Turkey, Elia Viviani
Giro dell'Appennino, Robert Kišerlovski
Stage 1 Tour de Romandie, Peter Sagan
Stage 4 Tour of California, Francesco Chicchi
Stages 5 & 6 Tour of California, Peter Sagan
Overall  Giro d'Italia, Ivan Basso
Stage 4, Team Time Trial
Stage 14, Vincenzo Nibali
Stage 15, Ivan Basso
 Overall Tour of Slovenia, Vincenzo Nibali
Stage 3, Vincenzo Nibali
Stage 4, Francesco Chicchi
 Road Race Championships, Aleksandr Kuschynski
Stage 1 Tour de Pologne, Jacopo Guarnieri
Gran Premio Industria e Commercio Artigianato Carnaghese, Ivan Basso
Gran Premio Città di Camaiore, Kristjan Koren
Trofeo Melinda, Vincenzo Nibali
Giro del Veneto, Daniel Oss
GP Città di Modena, Francesco Chicchi
 Overall Vuelta a España, Vincenzo Nibali
Memorial Marco Pantani, Elia Viviani
Giro di Toscana, Daniele Bennati
Stage 2 Circuit Franco-Belge, Jacopo Guarnieri
Binche–Tournai–Binche, Elia Viviani
2011
Gran Premio della Costa Etruschi, Elia Viviani
Tour de Mumbai I, Elia Viviani
 Overall Giro di Sardegna, Peter Sagan
Stages 1, 3 & 4, Peter Sagan
Gran Premio di Lugano, Ivan Basso
Stage 3a Driedaagse van de Panne, Jacopo Guarnieri
Stage 5 Tour of California, Peter Sagan
Stage 16 Giro d'Italia, Vincenzo Nibali
Stage 18 Giro d'Italia, Eros Capecchi
Stages 3 & 8 Tour de Suisse, Peter Sagan
Stage 1 Tour of Slovenia, Elia Viviani
 Road Race Championships, Peter Sagan
GP Kranj, Simone Ponzi
Gran Premio Nobili Rubinetterie – Coppa Città di Stresa, Elia Viviani
Gran Premio Nobili Rubinetterie – Coppa Papà Carlo, Simone Ponzi
 Overall Tour de Pologne, Peter Sagan
Stages 4 & 5, Peter Sagan
Stages 6, 12 & 21 Vuelta a España, Peter Sagan
Stages 4 & 5 USA Pro Cycling Challenge, Elia Viviani
Stage 6 USA Pro Cycling Challenge, Daniel Oss
 Overall Giro di Padania, Ivan Basso
Stage 2, Elia Viviani
Stage 4, Ivan Basso
Gran Premio Industria e Commercio di Prato, Peter Sagan
Stage 4 Tour of Beijing, Elia Viviani
2012
 Road Race Championships, Peter Sagan
 Road Race Championships, Timmy Duggan
 Time Trial Championships, Maciej Bodnar
Stage 6 Tour de San Luis, Elia Viviani
Gran Premio della Costa Etruschi, Elia Viviani
Overall Giro della Provincia di Reggio Calabria, Elia Viviani
Stages 1 & 2, Elia Viviani
Stage 2 Tour of Oman, Peter Sagan
Stage 5 Tour of Oman, Vincenzo Nibali
Trofeo Laigueglia, Moreno Moser
Gran Premio di Lugano, Eros Capecchi
 Overall Tirreno–Adriatico, Vincenzo Nibali
Stage 4, Peter Sagan
Stage 5, Vincenzo Nibali
Stage 2a Settimana internazionale di Coppi e Bartali, Elia Viviani
Stage 1 Three Days of De Panne, Peter Sagan
Eschborn–Frankfurt City Loop, Moreno Moser
Stages 1, 2, 3, 4 & 8 Tour of California, Peter Sagan
Stages 1 (ITT), 3, 4 & 6 Tour de Suisse, Peter Sagan
Stage 4 (ITT) Tour of Slovenia, Kristijan Koren
 Points classification in the Tour de France, Peter Sagan
Stages 1, 3 & 6 Tour de France, Peter Sagan
 Overall Tour de Pologne, Moreno Moser
Stages 1 & 6, Moreno Moser
 Overall Giro di Padania, Vincenzo Nibali
Stage 4, Vincenzo Nibali
Stage 1 Tour of Beijing, Elia Viviani
Japan Cup, Ivan Basso
2013
Stages 2 & 3 Tour of Oman, Peter Sagan
Gran Premio Città di Camaiore, Peter Sagan
Strade Bianche, Moreno Moser
Stages 3 & 6 Tirreno–Adriatico, Peter Sagan
Stage 5 Settimana Internazionale di Coppi e Bartali, Damiano Caruso
Gent–Wevelgem, Peter Sagan
Stage 1 Three Days of De Panne, Peter Sagan
Brabantse Pijl, Peter Sagan
Stages 3 & 8 Tour of California, Peter Sagan
Stage 2 Critérium du Dauphiné, Elia Viviani
Stage 8 Critérium du Dauphiné, Alessandro De Marchi
Stages 3 & 8 Tour de Suisse, Peter Sagan
 Time Trial Championships, Maciej Bodnar
 Time Trial Championships, Brian Vandborg
 Road Race Championships, Peter Sagan
Stage 7 Tour de France, Peter Sagan
 Points classification in the Tour de France, Peter Sagan
 Overall Tour of Elk Grove, Elia Viviani
Stages 2 & 3, Elia Viviani
Stages 1, 3, 6 & 7 USA Pro Cycling Challenge, Peter Sagan
Dutch Food Valley Classic, Elia Viviani
Prologue, Stages 1 & 5 Tour of Alberta, Peter Sagan
Stage 14 Vuelta a España, Daniele Ratto
Stage 1 Tour of Britain, Elia Viviani
Grand Prix Cycliste de Montréal, Peter Sagan
2014
Stage 4 Tour of Oman, Peter Sagan
Stage 3 Tirreno–Adriatico, Peter Sagan
E3 Harelbeke, Peter Sagan
Stage 3 Settimana Internazionale di Coppi e Bartali, Elia Viviani
Stage 1 Three Days of De Panne, Peter Sagan
Stage 3b (ITT) Three Days of De Panne, Maciej Bodnar
Stages 5 & 7 Tour of Turkey, Elia Viviani
Stage 7 Tour of California, Peter Sagan
Stage 3 Tour de Suisse, Peter Sagan
Stage 4 Tour of Slovenia, Elia Viviani
 Road Race Championships, Peter Sagan
Stages 2 & 4 Tour of Austria, Oscar Gatto
 Points classification in the Tour de France, Peter Sagan
 Overall Combativity award Tour de France, Alessandro De Marchi
Stage 4 USA Pro Cycling Challenge, Elia Viviani
Stage 7 Vuelta a España, Alessandro De Marchi
Coppa Bernocchi, Elia Viviani

Supplementary statistics

Notes

World and national champions

2000
 World Time Trial Serhiy Honchar
2001
 Ukrainian Time Trial Serhiy Honchar
2005
 Italian Road Race Enrico Gasparotto
2007
 Swedish Road Race Magnus Bäckstedt
2009
 Polish Time Trial Maciej Bodnar
 Finnish Road Race Kjell Carlström
2010
 Belarusian Road Race Aleksandr Kuschynski
2011
 Slovak Road Race Peter Sagan
2012
 Slovak Road Race Peter Sagan
 United States Road Race  Timmy Duggan
 Polish Time Trial Maciej Bodnar
2013
 Polish Time Trial Maciej Bodnar
 Danish Time Trial  Brian Vandborg
 Slovak Road Race Peter Sagan
2014
 Slovak Road Race Peter Sagan

Notes

References

External links

 

 
Former UCI WorldTeams
Cycling teams established in 1999
Defunct cycling teams based in Italy
Cycling teams disestablished in 2014
1999 establishments in Italy